Colobothea sublunulata is a species of beetle in the family Cerambycidae. It was described by Dmytro Zajciw in 1962. It is known from Bolivia.

References

sublunulata
Beetles described in 1962